Necșești is a commune in Teleorman County, Muntenia, Romania. It is composed of three villages: Belciug, Gârdești and Necșești.

Demography 

According to the 2011 Romanian census, the population of Necșești was 1,306, a decrease from 1,623 in 2002. Out of the 1,306 inhabitants, 1,251 of them are Romanian, 54 were marked "Information not available", and one listed as "other". As for religious denomination, the majority of the residents are Romanian Orthodox, with a small minority of Seventh-day Adventists, unknown and others.

Politics and Administration 
Necșești is administered by a mayor and a local council composed of 9 councilors. The current mayor, Marian-Ilie Bănăseanu, is from the Social Democratic Party, and has been in office since 2016. As of the 2020 Romanian local elections, the local council has the following composition by political parties:

References

Communes in Teleorman County
Localities in Muntenia